The Federation of Green Parties of Africa is an umbrella body of the various national Green parties and environmental parties in Africa. The formal coalition, the African Greens Federation (AGF) formed in 2010 at a conference in Kampala, Uganda. As part of the Global Greens, founded in 2001 in Canberra, Australia, the parties included in the Federation of Green Parties of Africa follow the Global Greens Charter. The organization's permanent administration is in Ouagadougou, the capital of Burkina Faso, where the predominant green organization is the Rassemblement Des Ecologistes du Burkina Faso. These parties tend to, but not always, be left-leaning and often do not have widespread support in their respective countries.

Principles of the Global Green Charter include:

Participatory Democracy
 Nonviolence
 Social justice
 Sustainability 
 Respect for Diversity
 Ecological Wisdom

Current leadership includes the President, Dr. Frank Habineza of the Democratic Green Party of Rwanda, Papa Meissa Dieng of the Convergence of Ecologists of Senegal (CES) as the Secretary General, and Robinah K. Nanyunja as treasurer. Nanyunja is an environmentalist from Uganda.

Goals of the coalition include helping such parties gain more political power, such as joining the parliamentary or legislative bodies. Such was a success for the Democratic Green Party of Rwanda, which gained a sufficient percent of the vote in 2018, allowing them to gain representation in the Rwandan parliament.

In addition to political parties, the ENGOs, or environmental non-governmental organizations, have played an important role on the continent after colonization in order to push for development and basic needs delivery.

Member parties
Full Member Parties and Organizations

Algeria: Parti Vert d'Algérie pour le Développement / Algerian Green Party
Burkina Faso: Rassemblement Des Ecologistes du Burkina Faso
Burundi: Burundi Green Movement
Chad: Union des Ecologistes Tchadiens - LES VERTS
Democratic Republic of Congo: Alliance des Ecologists Congolais - Les Verts (AECO - Les Verts)
Republic of Congo: Mouvement des Ecologistes Congolais-Les Verts
Egypt: Egyptian Green Party
Ivory Coast: Rassemblement des Verts Ivoiriens (RAVI)
Kenya: Green Congress of Kenya
Madagascar: Parti Vert Hasin’I Madagasikara
Mali: Parti Ecologiste du Mali
Mauritius: Les Verts Fraternels Mauritius
Morocco: Parti de la Gauche Verts du Maroc
Mozambique: Ecological Party of Mozambique - Movement of Earth / Partido Ecologista de Moçambique
Niger: Rassemblement pour un Sahel Vert/Parti Vert du Niger
Rwanda: Democratic Green Party of Rwanda
Senegal: Convergence des Ecologistes du Sénégal (CES)
Togo: Afrique Togo Ecologie
Tunisia: Parti Tunisie Verte pour le Progrès
Uganda: Ecological party of Uganda
Zambia: Green Party of Zambia
Zimbabwe: Green Party of Zimbabwe / United Crusade for Democracy (UCAD)

Other African non-members and observers

Algeria:
Ecology and Liberty Party
Angola:
National Ecological Party of Angola
Burkina Faso:
Ecologist Party for the Development of Burkina
Ecologist Party for Progress
Union of Greens for the Development of Burkina Faso
Cameroon:
Green Party for Democracy in Cameroon
Rally of Ecologic Forces for the Stimulation of the Economy
Union of Ecologists of Cameroon
Central African Republic:
Movement of Greens of Centrafrique
Republic of the Congo:
Movement of Greens of Congo
Democratic Republic of the Congo:
Rally of Congolese Ecologists - The Greens
Party of Congolese Ecologists
Côte d'Ivoire:
Ecologic Party of Greens of Côte d'Ivoire
Gabon:
Gabonese Ecologist Front
Mauritius:
Green Brothers
The Greens
Madagascar:
Rassemblement des Verts de Madagascar/Madagasikara Tany Maitso
Union nationale pour la démocratie et le développement
Morocco:
Izigzawen
Écologie et développement
Parti de l'environnement et du développement
Mozambique
Partido dos Verdes de Moçambique
Niger:
Rassemblement des Verts-Ni'ima
Nigeria
Green Party of Nigeria
Rwanda:
Democratic Green Party of Rwanda
Senegal:
Parti africain écologiste du Sénégal
Sudan:
Sudan Green Party
South Africa
ECOPEACE Party
Togo:
Pan-African Ecologist Party
Tunisia
Parti des verts pour le progrès
Tunisie verte
Uganda
Uganda Green Party
Zambia
Liberal Green Party of Zambia

Sister bodies
Sister continental Green Party organizations include the Federation of the Green Parties of the Americas, Asia-Pacific Green Network and European Federation of Green Parties.

See also

Biodiversity
Conservation movement
Conservation ethic
Environmental movement
Ecology
Ecosystem
Earth Science
Global Greens
Global warming
List of environmental organizations
Natural environment
Nature
Sustainability
Worldwide green parties

Notes

External links
Green Party Federations

Global Greens
Green parties in Africa
Pan-African organizations
Political party alliances in Africa
Politics of Africa